The John Dunning Best First Feature Award is a special Canadian film award, presented by the Academy of Canadian Cinema and Television to the year's best feature film by a first-time film director. Under the earlier names Claude Jutra Award and Canadian Screen Award for Best First Feature, the award has been presented since the 14th Genie Awards in 1993.

Formerly a juried prize whose winner was announced in advance of the ceremony, the award is now presented as a conventional category with a full shortlist of nominees.

To date six films, The Confessional (Le Confessionnal), Atanarjuat: The Fast Runner, Away from Her, A Colony (Une colonie), Beans and Scarborough, have won both the Best First Feature and Best Picture awards in the same year; the directors of Le Confessionnal, Atanarjuat, Away from Her and Scarborough also won the award for Best Director for the same films.

History

The award was originally named in memory of Claude Jutra, a Canadian film director who died in 1986. Formerly part of the Genie Awards ceremonies, the Claude Jutra Award was transitioned to be part of the new Canadian Screen Awards in 2013.

Following the February 2016 publication of Yves Lever's biography of Jutra, which contained allegations that Jutra had sexually abused underage children during his lifetime, the Academy announced that it was removing Jutra's name from the award. Québec Cinéma also removed Jutra's name from its Prix Jutra ceremonies on the same day.

Beginning with the 4th Canadian Screen Awards in 2016, the award was presented as the Canadian Screen Award for Best First Feature. In the same year the John Dunning Discovery Award, named in memory of film producer John Dunning, was introduced to honour microbudget films. Initially it was a separate award from the Best First Feature category, with the two awards presented alongside each other to different films, until the two awards were merged under the John Dunning Best First Feature Award name beginning with the 7th Canadian Screen Awards in 2019.

Winners

Claude Jutra Award

Best First Feature

John Dunning Discovery Award

John Dunning Best First Feature Award

See also
Prix Iris for Best First Film
Toronto International Film Festival Award for Best Canadian First Feature Film
Independent Spirit Award for Best First Feature & John Cassavetes Award - American film awards similar in content

References

Directorial debut film awards
Canadian Screen Award film categories
Awards established in 1993